An insurance bond (or investment bond) is a single premium life assurance policy for the purposes of investment.  

Due to tax laws they are a common form of investment in the UK and some offshore centres.

Traditionally insurance bonds were with-profits policies and were often called with-profit(s) bonds.  Since the introduction of unitised insurance funds they have often been marketed as unit-linked bonds or investment bonds.

Why invest in an insurance bond? 
The decision of which 'wrapper' to place funds within (i.e. onshore bond, offshore bond or collective) can be complex and is based upon the tax position of the investor, the treatment of each tax wrapper, the likely growth and investment term.

Insurance bonds can be useful vehicles for minimizing tax as they do not incur the 50% CGT reduction on assets held for 12 months or more.

Useful features of Bonds for tax planning scenarios include the tax deferred status, the ability to write the investment in trust and reduce the inheritance tax liability on an estate, and exclusive access to expensive investment links like guaranteed or protected profits funds are to name a few. Bonds can provide income or growth and  when income is required there are now bonds that can offer a set minimum guaranteed income for life of the plan holder.

For UK Financial Advisers, the Financial Services Authority is placing increasing focus on what wrapper is being recommended.  Advisers must be able to demonstrate they have used a robust process when selecting a bond or collective.

Range of investment funds 
Traditionally investment bonds only invested in the with-profit fund of the insurance company.  However, since the late 1970s the insurers have tried to compete directly with the unit trust market in offering a wide choice of unit-linked investment funds.  Geographic and themed funds for almost every sector are available.  

One innovation from the insurers is the distribution fund introduced by Sun Life in 1979.  A distribution fund is designed to provide a regular rising income for investors.  This is achieved by carefully balancing income generating assets such as corporate bonds and/or property with equities.  The equity element provides some growth and the other assets the income.  Since 2000 distribution bonds have been very popular and have provided another option to with-profit bonds as the low risk investment of choice in the UK.

History

See also 
Unit trusts
Collective investment scheme
Life assurance
Investment
With-profits policies
Unitised insurance funds

External links 
 http://www.investopedia.com/articles/pf/05/SinglePremLife.asp

Insurance